Chillagoe-Mungana Caves is a national park in Chillagoe, Shire of Mareeba, Queensland, Australia.

Geography 
The park is 1455 km northwest of Brisbane. The elevation of the terrain is 409 meters.

The park is located within the Walsh River catchment area and the Einasleigh Uplands bioregion.  A total of 10 rare or threatened species have been recorded in the park. Of these, 5 are mammals, diadem leaf-nosed bat, greater large-eared horseshoe bat, ghost bat, spectacled flying-fox and koala.

Facilities 
There are several self-guided limestone caves, the Archways, Pompeii cave, and Bauhinia cave.  The historic Chillagoe smelters area has mining relics from the 1890s.  There are a few small rock galleries of Indigenous Australian art.

Camping is not permitted.

See also

 Protected areas of Queensland

References

National parks of Far North Queensland
Protected areas established in 1995
Show caves in Australia
1995 establishments in Australia

Chillagoe, Queensland